The Morgan railway line or North-West Bend railway was a railway line on the South Australian Railways network.

History

The first section of the line opened from Gawler. It was built to service the copper mining at Kapunda, opened on 13 August 1860. It was extended to Morgan on 23 September 1878 to provide a more efficient freight and passenger connection between the Murray paddle steamers and both the city of Adelaide and Port Adelaide for ocean transport.

The Eudunda to Morgan section closed on 2 November 1969, and Morgan residents requested that the line was preserved to Mount Mary, though this was rejected, with the line being removed not long after.   In 1975, the remaining line to Eudunda and the Robertstown branch came under the ownership of Australian National as part of the SAR's sale to the Federal Government. The Kapunda to Eudunda section was closed on 11 March 1994 by AN, with the deterioration of the River Light bridge at Hansborough being cited as a reason for closure. This section was pulled up the following year. The remaining Gawler to Kapunda section was leased by the South Australian Government to Australian Southern Railroad (later known as ORA) in 1997 as part of AN's SA freight asset sale to Genesee and Wyoming. The line's last documented use was on 21 May 2003 by Australian Railroad Group locomotive CK4, though grain services had ceased years before. One Rail Australia continues to clear vegetation on the line to help meet the lease agreement with the SA Government, although the track itself has not been maintained since the last train passed.

Route

The Kapunda railway was the first extension of the line from Adelaide to Gawler. It passed through Roseworthy from where the Peterborough line later branched. The line headed northeast from Roseworthy to reach Freeling, then the line crossed the River Light just south of Kapunda. The extension continued through Hansborough, running across the River Light once again and Pine Creek before reaching Hampden, then turning south and going through a steep descent into Eudunda. From there, the line curved northwards towards the junction for the Robertstown line, then heading west across the plains adjacent to what is now the Thiele Highway to Morgan. The Robertstown line branch opened in 1914 from Eudunda to Robertstown, passing through Point Pass along the way.

Possible extension
There were proposals to extend the line to connect to Wentworth, New South Wales, and even to Hay to provide a more direct rail route to Sydney.

References

External links
Gallery

Closed railway lines in South Australia
Railway lines opened in 1860